The Mark 11 guided missile launching system (GMLS) is a twin-arm missile launcher designed for use on frigates and other military vessels.

The launcher could use the RIM-24 Tartar or RIM-66 Standard MR missile and was used on s and the first thirteen s. The destroyers had one launcher at the rear of the ship while the cruisers had 2 launchers mounted amidships on either side of the ship. New Threat Upgrade added the ability to launch RGM-84 Harpoon anti-ship missiles. The single armed Mark 13 missile launcher was similar in size and footprint and was used in the later Charles F. Adams class destroyers instead of the Mark 11.

Usage

Gallery

See also
List of United States Navy Guided Missile Launching Systems

References

External links

GMM 3 and 2 - GMLS

Naval weapons of the United States
Naval guided missile launch systems of the United States